Black Widow Murders: The Blanche Taylor Moore Story is a 1993 American drama film directed by Alan Metzger and written by Judith Paige Mitchell. It is based on the 1993 book Preacher's Girl by Jim Schutze. The film stars Elizabeth Montgomery, David Clennon, John M. Jackson, Grace Zabriskie, Bruce McGill and Mark Rolston. The film premiered on NBC on May 3, 1993.

Based on the true story of a North Carolina woman who murdered her first husband and a lover with arsenic.

A woman marries her boyfriend on his deathbed for his money so she can move on to the next guy. When he turns up mysteriously ill the police step in and investigate the strange circumstances.

Cast 
Elizabeth Montgomery as Blanche Taylor Moore
David Clennon as Dwight Moore
John M. Jackson as Raymond Reid
Grace Zabriskie as Ethel
Bruce McGill as Morgan
Mark Rolston as O'Keefe
Guy Boyd as Kevin Denton
John Philbin as Ray Jr.
Phoebe Augustine as Cathy
Matt Ryan as Stevie
Katy Boyer as Lujane
Thomas Mills Wood as Doug
Paul Collins as Dr. Nesbitt
Lisa Blake Richards as Linda Reid Sykes
E.R. Davies as Rev. Jim Rosser
Henry Brown as Officer Daniels
Lynn Llewelyn as Victoria
Stephen Root as Dr. Kirby
Tim Halligan as Dr. Gardner
Patricia Belcher as Nurse Kitty
Wendy Way as Nurse Amy
Michael Chieffo as Harvey
Rick Scarry as Raymond's Attorney
Rick Hall as Deputy Sheriff Bob
Erika Rosenzweig as Dwight's Daughter

References

External links
 

1993 television films
1993 films
1990s English-language films
1993 drama films
NBC network original films
Films directed by Alan Metzger
Films scored by David Michael Frank
American drama television films
1990s American films